Zinda is a Persian word meaning "live". It is also used in Assyrian Neo-Aramaic, Bengali, Hindi and Urdu and can refer to:

 Zinda Magazine, the largest online magazine serving the Syriac-speaking ethnic Assyrian Christian community around the world
 Zinda (film), a 2006 Bollywood film
 Lady Blackhawk (Zinda Blake), a DC Comics character and member of The Blackhawks and Birds of Prey
 "Zinda" (song), a song from the 2013 Hindi biographical drama Bhaag Milkha Bhaag

People 

 Zinda Kaul (1884–1965), Kashmiri poet
 Zinda Kaboré (1920–1947), politician of Voltaic origin